Irish Competition Law is the Irish body of legal rules designed to ensure fairness and freedom in the marketplace. The main (but not the only) purpose of Irish competition law is to enhance consumer welfare. The key provisions of Irish competition law: (a) usually outlaw anti-competitive arrangements between businesses and economic operators (known as "undertakings"); (b) always outlaw the abuse of dominance by undertakings; (c) control certain mergers, acquisitions and joint ventures; and (d) control certain activities in the grocery sector.

Irish competition law is primarily statute-based with some judge-made rules (the so-called "common law").  The statute rules are embodied primarily in the Competition Act 2002 (which replaced the Competition Acts 1991-1996), the Competition (Amendment) Act 2006; the Competition (Amendment) Act 2012; and the Competition and Consumer Protection Act 2014.

Irish competition law is comparable to, but quite different in certain key respects, from European Union competition law.  There are some similarities to the antitrust law of the United States of America but the differences (particularly in relation to merger control, abuse of dominance and the way in which breaches are punished) are substantial.  So it is best to see Irish competition law as sui generis.  For example, the Irish competition agency (the Competition and Consumer Protection Commission (the "CCPC")) may not impose fines while many competition agencies worldwide may do so.

Irish competition law is enforced by the courts (which have the power to find breaches, permit unannounced visits by the CCPC) and impose penalties), the CCPC (which has the power to institute investigations and take court actions) and private action by "aggrieved persons" (the latter do not have to be undertakings).  Unlike many other competition agencies (such as the [European Commission]), the CCPC does not, and may not, have the power to impose fines; this is due to the Irish Constitution which limits the power to impose penalties and sanctions to the judicial system (i.e., the courts); some would argue that Irish competition law is a better system for having the filter of the CCPC having to make its case to the police (the Garda Siochana) and the Director of Public Prosecutions before cases are instituted with the extra protection of the judges and, in criminal cases, juries acting as a filter to ensure robust cases are taken.

Relationship with EU Competition Law

Irish competition law, Irish law must not contradict or inhibit the operation of EC law, but it may outlaw things which are legal under EU law, or punish breaches more severely. It also exercises a persuasive force over the jurisprudence of Irish competition law. Due to the requirement of compliance with EU law and the similar understanding and goals, Irish Courts will examine cases and precedents in the European Courts to see how it has been interpreted or to ensure that they are consistent. EU competition law has jurisdiction over cases which affect inter-state trade in the Union.

Regulation 1/2003 of the European Commission "decentralised" the enforcement of competition law with a number of reforms designed to increase the enforcement of EC rules in national courts.

Enforcement
The law is primarily enforced by the  Competition and Consumer Protection Commission (which replaced the Irish Competition Authority on 31 October 2014), who review mergers, and investigate cartels and abuse of dominance by undertakings. They can fine offenders, when can be appealed to the High Court. Private enforcement is also possible. An aggrieved party may sue the offender for damages under the Competition Act. However this facility has not been exercised much, possibly due to the difficulty of gathering evidence to prove such a breach. Regulation 1/2003 of the European Commission sought to increase private and public enforcement of EC rules in national courts to allow the commission to concentrate on bigger cases.

The CCPC operates a Cartel Immunity Programme which allows for immunity or leniency in sentencing for offenders which supply information to them that allows the prosecution of other breaches of the law. The rule mirrors the European Commission's Leniency policy.

Irish competition law also regulates certain mergers, acquisitions and joint ventures.  Part III of the Competition Act 2002 provides that the Competition Authority must approve transactions which fall within the scope of Part III before they may be lawfully implemented.

Ireland has achieved considerable success in enforcing competition law by virtue of successful criminal prosecutions against various individuals and companies.  It has almost thirty convictions for competition law breaches including jury convictions for cartel-related activity.

See also
List of Acts of the Oireachtas

Notes

References
 Vincent J G Power, Competition Law and Practice (Tottel)
 Alan J W McCarthy and Vincent J G Power, Competition Act 2002 (Tottel)

External links
 Competition and Consumer Protection Commission's website
 Irish Competition Authority's website

Irish laws
Competition law by country